Hugo Humberto Gutiérrez Gálvez (born 5 October 1961) is a Chilean politician who was elected as a member of the Chilean Constitutional Convention.

On 12 January 2021, he resigned to the Chamber of Deputies of Chile to run for the Constitutional Convention. His position was replaced by Rubén Moraga Mamani, former governor of Tamarugal Province.

References

External links
 

Living people
1961 births
Chilean politicians
People from Iquique
21st-century Chilean politicians
Communist Party of Chile politicians
Members of the Chilean Constitutional Convention
Deputies of the LV Legislative Period of the National Congress of Chile
University of Concepción alumni